Major General Francis Hedley Roberton "Buster" Howes,  (born 22 March 1960) is a former Royal Marines officer who served as Commandant General Royal Marines from February 2010 to December 2011.

Early life
Howes was educated at Christ's Hospital, a private school in Horsham, West Sussex. He studied chemistry at the University of York, graduating with a Bachelor of Science degree. He completed a Master of Arts degree in strategic studies at the University of London.

Military career
Howes was commissioned into the Royal Marines in 1982. He became a troop commander in 42 Commando and had his first posting to Northern Ireland. After training as a Mountain Leader, he transferred to 45 Commando. He served in the Gulf War while on secondment to the United States Marine Corps. He served as a planner in the Rapid Reaction Force Operations Staff of United Nations Protection Force during the Bosnian War in 1995.

Howes led 42 Commando during the 2003 invasion of Iraq, for which he was appointed an Officer of the Order of the British Empire. He became Chief Joint Coordination and Effects in Headquarters ISAF in Afghanistan in 2007, and Director of Naval Staff later that year. He went on to be commander of 3 Commando Brigade in April 2008, Head of Overseas Operations in the Ministry of Defence in 2009 and Commandant General Royal Marines in February 2010. He was Head of the British Defence Staff – US and Defence Attaché in Washington, D.C. from 2011 to 2015, and was appointed an Companion of the Order of the Bath in the 2013 Birthday Honours.

Later career
In June 2020, Howes was appointed Chief Executive of the Royal Edinburgh Military Tattoo after having served as a non-executive director of the organisation since 2015.

References

1960 births
Living people
Military personnel from Newcastle upon Tyne
Royal Marines generals
British military attachés
People educated at Christ's Hospital
Alumni of the University of York
Officers of the Order of the British Empire
Royal Navy personnel of the War in Afghanistan (2001–2021)
Royal Navy personnel of the Gulf War
Royal Navy personnel of the Iraq War
Companions of the Order of the Bath